Ganapathy is a residential neighbourhood in the city of Coimbatore in Tamil Nadu, India. It is located in the north-eastern part of the city. This is the most densely populated area within Coimbatore Corporation limits.

Geography
Ganapathy is situated 3.5 km away from Gandhipuram, 6.5 km away from Townhall, 7 km away from Ukkadam, 8 km from Singanallur, 8.5 km from Coimbatore International Airport, and 16 km from Coimbatore Integrated Bus Terminus. The nerve centre of the locality is Sathy Road. Ganapathy shares border with Chinnavedampatti, Gandhipuram, Poosaripalayam, Rathinapuri, Maniyakarampalayam, Peelamedu, Saravanampatti, Vilankurichi and Avarampalayam.

Infrastructure
Ganapathy is one of the well-connected localities in the city and has many roads linking to various parts of the Coimbatore Metropolitan Area.The various arterial roads in the area are Sathy Road, Avarampalayam Road, FCI Road, Athipalayam Road a Rathinapuri Road. The stretch between Textool Railway flyover to Ganapathy Signal of the Sathy Road is the most congested road in Tamil Nadu.

To decongest the Sathy Road especially in Ganapathy area, the State Highways Department has proposed to develop Peelamedu–Kalapatti-Saravanampatty and Kurumbapalayam Road into a ring road along the banks of Sanganoor stream. According to the Highways sources, the 12-km stretch from SITRA Junction in Peelamedu would run through Kalapatti and join Sathyamangalam Road at Saravanampatti and then it would join Mettuppalayam Road at Thudiyalur. On completion of this stretch, the Ganapathy section of the Sathy Road would have options of diverting through either sides bypassing Gandhipuram.

Transport
The nearest railway station to Ganapathy is the Coimbatore North Junction where most trains terminating at the Coimbatore Junction has stop to serve the northern localities of the city.
All the town buses from  Gandhipuram and Ukkadam to the northern suburbs along the Sathy Road pass through Ganapathy. 
Ganapathy easy access to :
 Gandhipuram : Via Sathy Road
 Airport : Via FCI Road
 Goundampalayam : Via Maniyakarampalayam Road
 Railway Station : Via MG Road Avarampalayam

Entertainment
The various parks in Ganapathy are:
Sri Thiruvengadam Nagar Park
EB Colony Children's Park

Healthcare
There are a number of hospitals operating from Ganapathy:
The Pan Indian eye care group Sankara Eye Care Institutions - India  
The Pan Indian eye care group Sankara Eye Care Institutions, based in India, was founded in 1998 by Dr. Venkataswamy. The group's mission is to provide high-quality eye care services to the poor and underprivileged, regardless of caste, creed, religion or gender. Sankara Eye Care Institutions has established a network of eye care facilities across India, providing comprehensive eye care services, ranging from basic eye health checkups and screenings to advanced eye surgeries and treatments. The organization also runs educational programs and community outreach initiatives to raise awareness and knowledge about eye health and preventive measures. In addition, Sankara Eye Care Institutions has provided free or heavily subsidized eye care services to over 15 million people since its inception, and has successfully restored vision to over 3 million people.
Sooriya Hospital
Sooriya Hospital Ganapathy is a multispecialty hospital located in Coimbatore, Tamil Nadu. It offers a range of medical services including inpatient and outpatient care, diagnostics, advanced surgeries, and health check-ups. The hospital has a team of experienced and skilled doctors, technicians, and support staff who provide the highest quality of medical care in the most affordable and patient-friendly manner. The hospital also provides 24-hour emergency services.
Siva Hospital, Kovai E.N.T. Clinic
VEEYES Dental Care
Indian Ayurvedic Hospital at Vilankurichi Road

Real Estate
Though Ganapathy area is already densely and over-populated locality with a large number of residential as well as commercial complexes.

AFNHB (Air Force Naval Housing Board) Project
Surprisingly, AFNHB, a Central Government Organisation for the welfare of Defence Personnel, has also launched their project for constructing apartments for Air Force and Navy personnels, in Ganapathy. First of its kind in Coimbatore, the foundation for the ₹88-crore project to come up on 13-odd acres, was laid by Rear Admiral R. Gaikwad, Director General, AFNHB. The contract for execution of the project has been given to Shapoorji Pallonji and Company Limited. While launching the project, Rear Admiral Gaikwad said it would have 372 dwelling units besides a swimming pool, community centre, and jogging path.

Industrial Sector
Large number of such industries in BPO sector are operating their offices from Ganapathy, due to easy availability of trained manpower in this area.

Education

Major Schools
 Corporation High School
 Apex Primary & Nursery School
 United Nursery & Primary School
 Grace Joseph Amala English Medium School
 CMS Matriculation Higher Secondary School
 Kovai Kalaimagal Matriculation Higher Secondary School

Important Colleges
 J.A.S College
 DA College
 SNR Sons College
 Dr SNS Rajalakshmi College Of Arts And Science
 Sri Siva Nursing College

Coimbatore Metro
Coimbatore Metro feasibility study is completed and one of the metro corridors is being proposed from Ganeshapuram to Karunya Nagar via Ganapathy covering 44 km.

Worshipping
Venugopalaswamy Temple, Ganapathy, is a Vaishnavite temple found on the road that leads to Sanganoor.

References

Neighbourhoods in Coimbatore